Royal High Corstorphine RFC is a former Edinburgh rugby union club, formed from the merger of the Royal HSFP and Corstorphine RFC. The merged club was dissolved in 2017 as two clubs:- Corstorphine Cougars and Barnton RFC.

History

Royal High Corstorphine was formed in 2003 from the merger of two Edinburgh rugby union sides:- Royal HSFP and Corstorphine RFC. RHC was originally planned as a bilateral club based both in Royal HSFP's Barnton ground and Corstorphine RFC's Union Park.

The club had a very successful women's side that produced several Scotland international players.

Dissolve of club

As time passed more and more matches were being played in Barnton; eventually the 1st XV playing in Barnton and the 2nd XV played in Union Park. This highlighted differences between the two factions on how a club should be run and the merged club was dissolved into two clubs.

Honours

Men

 Edinburgh Northern Sevens
 Champions : (1) 2004

Notable players

Mens
 Andrew Crammond - played for Edinburgh at under-16, under-17 and under-18 levels, and for Scotland under-18. He made his Scotland under-20 debut in Athlone in January 2014, against Ireland in the 6 Nations and scored his first try, against France, at Netherdale on 7 March 2014.  Represented Scotland at the U20 World Championships in New Zealand in 2013. He currently plays for Toulon.

Scotland Women Internationals
 Lee Cockburn
 Sonia Cull
 Louise Dalgliesh
 Cara DiSilva
 Sarah Dixon
 Ronnie Fitzpatrick
 Tanya Griffith
 Donna Kennedy
 Alison MacDonald
 Jilly McCord
 Mags McHardy
 Louise Moffat
 Lynne Reid
 Gayle Stewart

The Brothers

From 2010 the 2nd XV have been branded as The Brothers named Marc Maiden. Under the new team name The Brothers started the 2010–11 season winning 9 out of 9 games

The 2nd XV continued as a successful outfit with the management team of Mike "Iron" Whitside and Dougie Cross.

References

Defunct Scottish rugby union clubs
Rugby union in Edinburgh
Sports teams in Edinburgh
Rugby union clubs disestablished in 2017
Rugby clubs established in 2003
2003 establishments in Scotland
2017 disestablishments in Scotland